Ronald Curry Ferris (born 2 July 1945) is a Canadian Anglican bishop. A former bishop of the Anglican Church of Canada, he now serves as an assistant bishop of the Anglican Network in Canada. He is married to Jan, has six adult children and several grandchildren, and lives in Langley, British Columbia.

Ferris was educated at The University of Western Ontario He was ordained an Anglican priest in 1970. He has doctorates in Sacred Theology, Ministry and Theology. He had incumbencies at St Luke's Church, Old Crow, Yukon and St Stephen's Memorial Church, London, Ontario. In 1981 he became the Bishop of Yukon. He was translated to be the Bishop of Algoma in 1995 and resigned that see in September 2008.

A theological conservative, he was candidate at the election for Primate of the Anglican Church if Canada in 2004. He disapproved of the pro-homosexuality policies taken by some dioceses of the Anglican Church of Canada and decided to leave it. He was received as a bishop of the Anglican Church of the Southern Cone of America in January 2009, by Archbishop Gregory Venables. Ferris became an assisting bishop for the Anglican Network in Canada, a founding diocese of the Anglican Church in North America, in June 2009. Ferris main focus is church planting in the Lower Mainland of British Columbia, while he also assists the Moderator Bishop. He became the vicar of a newly founded parish in Langley, the Church of Ascension.

References

External links
Ron Ferris Biography at the Anglican Network in Canada Official Website

1945 births
University of Western Ontario alumni
Anglican bishops of Yukon
Anglican bishops of Algoma
Bishops of the Anglican Church in North America
20th-century Anglican Church of Canada bishops
Living people
Anglican realignment people